Daurel e Betó; Daurèl e Beton in modern Occitan, Daurel et Beton in French, "Daurel and Beton"), is an anonymous chanson de geste in Old Occitan which full title reads Lo romans de Daurel e de Betó. It is made up of 2198 lines, grouped in 53 monorhymed laisses of alexandrines (1-138) and decasyllables (139-2198), but the last fifteen being only partially readable , the end of the story remains a mystery. The one extant record of the text is a poorly kept manuscript discovered in 1876 by Ambroise-Firmin Didot. Though it could never be authentified before, the existence of such a work had been known since the early Middle Ages through a quick mention in a poem by the troubadour Guiraut de Cabrera. Daurel e Betó was written in the late twelfth or the early first half of the thirteenth century and is connected with the cycle of Charlemagne, but by the romantic character of the events is more like a regular romance of adventure. Excluding the cities of Paris and Babylon, all the places evoked in the tale are located in a region comprised between Poitiers and Agen, where it was probably composed. A thorough study of the vocabulary and alleged pronunciation (there was no fixed rules for spelling) of the author further reduces this area to Haute-Garonne and Tarn. Moreover, Beton, Aicelina, Gauserand and Bertrand were names mostly found in Occitania.

Opening lines

References

External links
Full online text

Occitan literature
Chansons de geste